The Crabs were a Portland, Oregon-based indie-rock band. Originally formed as a duo with Jonn Lunsford (vocals, guitar) and Lisa Jackson (vocals, drums), the pair later added keyboardist Sarah Dougher following their 1997 release What Were Flames Now Smolder.

Members 
 Jonn Lunsford – Vocals and guitar
 Lisa Jackson – Vocals and drums
 Sarah Dougher – Organ (on Sand and Sea)

Discography 
Albums

7"s

Singles

Notes

1993 establishments in Oregon
1999 disestablishments in Oregon
Indie rock musical groups from Oregon
Musical groups established in 1993
Musical groups disestablished in 1999
Musical groups from Portland, Oregon